The Irish Association for Applied Linguistics (Irish: Cumann na Teangeolaíochta Feidhmí), or IRAAL, is an academic society that connects language lecturers, language teachers, and researchers in linguistics, applied linguistics, and sociolinguistics with an active community keeping up with the latest language developments across Ireland. IRAAL is affiliated with the International Association of Applied Linguistics (AILA) and pursues its aim of supporting research by organising seminars, lectures, conferences and workshops. IRAAL publishes Teanga, an annual journal, as well as other special volumes.

History
IRAAL was founded in 1975 to support research in applied and general linguistics in Ireland. The initial discussion of its establishment was instigated by Professor Conn Ó Cléirigh, the first Chairman of Institiúd Teangeolaíochta Éireann (ITÉ).

See also
Applied linguistics
Language acquisition
Linguistics

References

External links
Irish Association for Applied Linguistics - official site

Professional associations based in Ireland
Scientific societies based in Ireland
Linguistic societies
1975 establishments in Ireland
Organizations established in 1975